Africotriton adelphum is a species of sea snail, a marine gastropod mollusc in the family Cancellariidae, the nutmeg snails.

References

External links
 Bouchet P. & Petit R.E. (2002). New species of deep-water Cancellariidae (Gastropoda) from the southwestern Pacific. The Nautilus 116(3): 95–104

Cancellariidae
Gastropods described in 2002